Paul Hyde Bonner (14 February 1893 – 14 December 1968) was an American banker, soldier, singer, diplomat, and author.

In February 1934, Bonner's collection of first editions was auctioned off by the American Art Association and Anderson Galleries on East 57th Street, New York City.

In April 1936, his feature We Live in the Country was published in Vogue. In October 1936, a "semi-fiction" article of his, Stalker & Co was published in Esquire, illustrated by Gilbert Bundy.

Bonner did not start writing books until his late 50s. His first novel was SPQR in 1952. He published two collection of stories about the outdoor life: in 1954, The Glorious Mornings, Stories of Shooting and Fishing, and in 1958, Aged in the Woods.

His wife's death was reported in the New York Times on January 2, 1962.

References

1893 births
1968 deaths
20th-century American diplomats
20th-century American novelists
20th-century American short story writers
American bankers
American male short story writers
American male novelists
Place of birth missing
Place of death missing